Alexander Barrett Macdonald (21 October 1918 – 5 March 2014) was a Canadian politician who served for several years in the Legislative Assembly of British Columbia and briefly in the House of Commons of Canada. He was a barrister and solicitor by career.

The son of Malcolm Archibald Macdonald, Macdonald was educated at the University of British Columbia and Osgoode Hall. He worked with the Department of Munitions and Supplies in Ottawa during World War II. During that time, he married Dorothy Ann Lewis. After the war, he served as secretary for M. J. Coldwell and then practised law in Ontario for a short time. In 1948, he opened his own practice in Vancouver.

He was elected to the Canadian Parliament in the riding of Vancouver Kingsway in the 1957 general election as a member of the Co-operative Commonwealth Federation. In the following year, he was defeated by John Ferguson Browne of the Progressive Conservative party in the 1958 election.

He was first elected to the B.C. legislature in the 1960 general election as the member for Vancouver East, and held this seat until his retirement in 1986. In 1972 he became Attorney General of British Columbia in the New Democratic Party government led by Dave Barrett and held this position until the NDP's defeat in the 1975 general election. He wrote three books on politics and law:  My Dear Legs, Alex in Wonderland, and Outrage: Canada's Justice System on Trial.

His wife of 64 years died in 2009. He died at the age of 95 on 5 March 2014.

References

1918 births
2014 deaths
Attorneys General of British Columbia
British Columbia Co-operative Commonwealth Federation MLAs
British Columbia New Democratic Party MLAs
Canadian people of Scottish descent
Co-operative Commonwealth Federation MPs
Lawyers in British Columbia
Members of the Executive Council of British Columbia
Members of the House of Commons of Canada from British Columbia
Osgoode Hall Law School alumni
Peter A. Allard School of Law alumni
Politicians from Vancouver
Academic staff of Simon Fraser University
Writers from Vancouver
20th-century Canadian politicians
20th-century Canadian writers
20th-century Canadian male writers